Blizianka  (Blyzianka) is a village in the administrative district of Gmina Niebylec, within Strzyżów County, Subcarpathian Voivodeship, in south-eastern Poland.

The village has a population of 180.

References

Blizianka